Vfl 07 Bremen is a German football club located in the Findorff neighbourhood of north Bremen. They play in the Bremen-Liga, one of fourteen regional leagues in the fifth tier of German football.

History 
The club was formed in 1907 by a 14-year-old named Hermann Popper. The original name of the team was Fußball Club Hohenzollern, in tribute to the German Emperor Wilhelm II of Hohenzollern. After the German Empire was dissolved in 1918, the name Verein für Leibesübungen 07 was informally adopted, although the club name was not officially changed until after the end of World War II in 1945.

In recent times the club has fluctuated between the Landesliga Bremen and the Bremen-Liga above, playing in the latter again since 2013.

Stadium 
VfL 07 Bremen play their home matches in BSA Findorff, Bremen. The stadium has a capacity of 2000 spectators.

Honours 
 Landesliga Bremen (VI):
 Runners-up (1): 2006–07, 2012–13
 Bezirksliga Bremen (VII):
 Winners (1): 2003–04

References

External links 
 

Football clubs in Germany
Association football clubs established in 1907
Vfl Bremen
Sport in Bremen (city)
1907 establishments in Germany